Hangu District may refer to:

Hangu District, Tianjin, a former district in Tianjin Municipality, China
Hangu District, Khyber Pakhtunkhwa, a district in Khyber Pakhtunkhwa Province, Pakistan

District name disambiguation pages